Diego Blanco (born 10 March 1988) is a retired Bolivian football defender.

References

1988 births
Living people
Sportspeople from Cochabamba
Bolivian footballers
Club Aurora players
La Paz F.C. players
Club Real Potosí players
Club Atlético Ciclón players
Bolivian Primera División players
Association football defenders